Andrew J. Swan   (1858 – ?) was a professional baseball first baseman. He played in the  American Association for the Washington Nationals and the Richmond Virginians. He hit .258 in 31 at-bats.

Personal life and mystery
	
After his baseball career ended, Swan worked as a telegraph operator. He married Cathrine Hogan in 1897 and lived with her in Washington, D.C., until about 1901. Hogan was listed as a widow in 1903, even though Swan was listed as still living in 1904. Later in 1904, a telegraph operator named Andy Swan was arrested in Chicago. This means that Swan's post-baseball days may have been more complicated than it seemed. His death date and location are currently unknown. He was not mentioned as a survivor when his brother died in 1920.

External links

https://sabr.org/bioproj/person/andy-swan/

1858 births
Major League Baseball first basemen
Baseball players from Pennsylvania
Richmond Virginians players
19th-century baseball players
Newark Domestics players
Richmond Virginians (minor league) players
Year of death missing